Zebedeo John Opore (born 8 January 1947)  is a Kenyan politician. He was elected to represent the Bonchari Constituency in the National Assembly of Kenya in the 1997 Kenyan general election. He also served as the Assistant Minister in the Ministry of Information & Broadcasting. He later lost the seat in the 2007 election to Charles Onyancha.

John read economics at the University of Nairobi. He also obtained an MSc in Economics from the University of Bradford in the UK in 1982.

References

Living people
Alumni of the University of Bradford
1947 births
Members of the National Assembly (Kenya)